Burhan Ali was a self-declared Shah of Shirvan. He claimed to be son of Khalilullah II.

Life 
His name was first recorded in 1544, when he invaded Shirvan with aid from Kaitag and was defeated by Alqas Mirza. He travelled to Istanbul after defeat and was aided by Suleyman the Magnificent. He rebelled again in Shirvan in 1547 but was defeated by the governor of Shirvan, future shah Ismail II. Taking advantage of the Ottoman–Safavid War, he easily invaded Shirvan a final time, captured Shamakhy in 1548, and declared himself Shirvanshah.

Death 
In 1549, the Safavid army under Abdulla khan Ustajli was sent to Shirvan to end the rebellion. Burhan Ali managed to ambush them in Bugurd Valley but the sudden death of Burhan in 1550 because of a disease stopped future independence plans.

Ancestors 
Sara Ashurbeyli states that Burhan Ali claimed to be son of Khalilullah II, however Abbasgulu Bakikhanov suggested his full name as "Burhan Ali bin Keyqobad bin Abu Bakr bin Amir Ishaq bin Ibrahim I of Shirvan".

References 

Year of birth unknown
16th-century people of Safavid Iran
Rebellions against Safavid Iran